Cojocna is a commune in Cluj County, Transylvania, Romania. It is composed of eight villages: Boj-Cătun (Bósi alagút), Boju (Kolozsbós), Cara (Kolozskara), Cojocna, Huci (Cserealja), Iuriu de Câmpie (Mezőőr), Moriști (Hurubák) and Straja (Szávatanya).

Demographics 
According to the census from 2011 there was a total population of 4,194 people living in this commune. Of this population, 55.8% are ethnic Romanians, 20.4% are ethnic Roma and 16.7% are ethnic Hungarians.

Natives
Grigore Răceanu
János Spáda

References 

Communes in Cluj County
Localities in Transylvania
Mining communities in Romania